Skiing is a video game cartridge for the Atari 2600.  It was authored by Bob Whitehead and released by Activision in 1980. It's one of the first video games developed by Activision.

Gameplay

Skiing is a single player only game, in which the player uses the joystick to control the direction and speed of a stationary skier at the top of the screen, while the background graphics scroll upwards, thus giving the illusion the skier is moving.  The player must avoid obstacles, such as trees and moguls.  The game cartridge contains five variations each of two principal games.

In the downhill mode, the player's goal is to reach the bottom of the ski course as rapidly as possible, while a timer records his relative success.

In the slalom mode, the player must similarly reach the end of the course as rapidly as he can, but must at the same time pass through a series of gates (indicated by a pair of closely spaced flagpoles). Each gate missed counts as a penalty against the player's time.

Promotion
Skiing was promoted via a 30-second TV commercial featuring a man demonstrating how to play the game (including the various obstacles into which a player can crash), while speaking in a stereotypical French accent. The commercial ends with a close-up of the game box, with the man's voice heard off-screen (now speaking in a general American accent) saying, "I think I hurt myself," in reference to his numerous virtual crashes.

Reception
Richard A. Edwards reviewed Skiing in The Space Gamer No. 43. Edwards commented that "Skiing is a simple game with excellent graphics and varying scenarios. It's a must for those with the Atari system."

Reviews
JoyStik (Dec, 1982)
Computer and Video Games (Jan, 1982)

See also

List of Atari 2600 games
List of Activision games: 1980–1999

References

External links
Skiing at Atari Mania

1980 video games
Atari 2600 games
Atari 2600-only games
Activision games
Skiing video games
Video games developed in the United States